This is a list of cheeses typical of the United States. The list excludes specific brand names, unless a brand name is also a distinct variety of cheese. While the term "American cheese" is legally used to refer to a variety of processed cheese, many styles of cheese originating in Europe are also made in the United States, such as brie, cheddar, gouda, mozzarella, and provolone. Also, many local dairies throughout the country produce artisan cheeses and other more localized flavors. Almost half of the cheese produced in the United States comes from Wisconsin and California; they along with New York and Vermont are well-known within the U.S. for their cheese. The U.S. dairy industry cheese exports has grown by 2,900% in the last two decades, making it the second largest cheese exporter in the world.

American cream cheeses

 Bergenost
 Cream cheese
 Creole cream cheese
 Cup cheese
 Red Hawk cheese, triple-crème cow's milk cheese with a brine washed rind, made in California
 Kunik cheese

American soft cheeses
 BellaVitano Cheese
 Brick cheese
 Cheese curd
 Colby cheese
 Colby-Jack cheese
 Farmer cheese
 Hoop cheese, drier version of farmer cheese
 String cheese, particular American variety of mozzarella with a stringy texture
 Cougar Gold cheese, an American cheddar
 Humboldt Fog, made in California
 Liederkranz cheese
 Monterey Jack
 Pepper jack cheese, variety of Monterey Jack
 Pinconning cheese, aged variety of Colby
 Pizza cheese, specially made for its melting qualities
 Muenster cheese, extremely mild, semi-soft with annatto exterior, nothing like name-controlled washed rind Alsacian Muenster
 Swiss cheese related to the Emmental cheese of  Switzerland  but slightly different
Baby Swiss, mild variety
Lacey Swiss, mild, lower-fat variety
Smoked Swiss
Aged Swiss, the oldest and strongest flavor 
 Vermont cheddar

American hard cheeses
 Capricious, goat's milk cheese made in Petaluma, California
 American generic parmesan, developed in the United States but inspired by Parmigiano-Reggiano cheese from Italy

American blue cheeses
 Maytag Blue cheese, brand name which is also a distinct variety of cheese

Processed cheeses
 American cheese, a variety of processed cheese usually created from a combination of Colby and cheddar cheeses
 Government cheese, variety of processed cheese food
 Nacho cheese
 Old English, a processed cheese from Kraft, often used in cheese balls, sold in a small glass jar 
 Pimento cheese
 Pizza cheese, some varieties are not cheese but processed cheese
 Provel cheese
 Roka Blue, a processed blue cheese often used in cheese balls
 Velveeta, brand name for a softer style of processed cheese than American cheese

American Fresh cheeses
 Cottage Cheese, made from skimmed milk, soupy texture.

See also

 List of cheeses
 List of cheesemakers
 List of American foods

References

Cheeses (American)
American